The 7th Assembly District of Wisconsin is one of 99 districts in the Wisconsin State Assembly.  Located in southeast Wisconsin, the district comprises part of central Milwaukee County, including the village of West Milwaukee and eastern parts of the cities of West Allis and Greenfield, as well as several neighboring wards of the city of Milwaukee. The district is represented by Democrat Daniel Riemer, since January 2013.

The 7th Assembly district is located within Wisconsin's 3rd Senate district, along with the 8th and 9th Assembly districts.

List of past representatives

References 

Wisconsin State Assembly districts
Milwaukee County, Wisconsin